Bouq Émissaire is a raw milk goat cheese with an ash-covered rind  made by Fromages Chaput of Châteauguay, Quebec, Canada.  It is aged by Dépendances du Manoir of Brigham, Quebec. The name is a misspelling of the French term for "scapegoat".

See also
 List of goat milk cheeses
 List of cheeses

References 

Canadian cheeses
Goat's-milk cheeses